Botanical gardens in Switzerland have collections consisting entirely of Switzerland native and endemic species; most have a collection that include plants from around the world. There are botanical gardens and arboreta in all states and territories of Switzerland, most are administered by local governments, some are privately owned.
 Arboretum Zürich
 Botanical Garden of the University of Basel, Basel
 Berne Botanical Garden, Bern
 Alpine botanical garden, Champex
 Botanical Garden Schatzalp, Davos
 Botanical Garden of the University of Fribourg, Fribourg
 Conservatory and Botanical Garden of the City of Geneva, Geneva
 Cantonal Botanical Museum and Gardens (Musée et jardins botaniques cantonaux), Lausanne
 Botanical Garden of the University and City of Neuchâtel, Neuchâtel
 Botanical Garden St. Gallen, St. Gallen
 Botanical Garden of St Triphon, Saint-Triphon (municipality of Ollon)
 Chinese Garden, Zurich
 Old Botanical Garden, Zurich
 Schynige Platte Alpine Garden, Gündlischwand, Canton of Bern
 University Botanical Garden, Zurich

References 

Switzerland
Botanical gardens